Lima is a historic former train station in Lima, Ohio, United States.  Built for the Pennsylvania Railroad in 1887, it is a brick Queen Anne structure that rests on a sandstone foundation.  The Lima station is located 261 miles west of Pennsylvania Station in Pittsburgh, PA, 705 miles west of Pennsylvania Station in New York, NY, and 228 miles east of Chicago Union Station in Chicago, IL along the former Pennsylvania Railroad's mainline between New York City and Chicago.  Lima station was formerly served by the Pennsylvania Railroad's Pennsylvania Limited and by its  flagship Broadway Limited daily passenger trains between New York City and Chicago in its later years.

Railroad history
Allen County's first railroad line was built by the Indiana Railroad in 1854 and later subsumed into the Pennsylvania Railroad system.  By the early twentieth century, Lima was a transportation center located at the confluence of five major American railroads: Pennsylvania Railroad; Baltimore & Ohio Railroad (a.k.a. B&O); New York, Chicago & St. Louis Railroad (a.k.a. Nickel Plate Road); Erie Railroad; and Detroit, Toledo & Ironton Railroad (a.k.a. DT&I),  and its economy was highly dependent on the industry-leading, world-famous Lima Locomotive Works.

Free Serviceman's Canteen 
From 1942 to 1970 the station hosted the Free Serviceman's Canteen, assisting troops in transit during World War II, the Korean War, and the Vietnam War.

Trains at mid-20th Century
Several of the above mentioned railroads had passenger trains making stops at the station.
Baltimore & Ohio
Great Lakes Limited, Detroit-Cincinnati, until 1950, when it was replaced by:
Cincinnatian, Detroit-Cincinnati, 1950-1971
Night Express, Detroit-Cincinnati, 1960-1971
Nickel Plate
Blue Arrow (Cleveland-St. Louis)/Blue Dart (St. Louis-Cleveland)
Pennsylvania 
Admiral, Chicago-New York, until 1964
General, Chicago-New York, until 1967
Manhattan Limited, Chicago-New York (only eastbound), both directions in Penn Central era, 1968-1971)
Pennsylvania Limited, Chicago-New York, until 1971
Broadway Limited, Chicago-New York (only in Penn Central/Amtrak era, 1968-1990)

Declining operations
In 1990 the last remaining passenger train, the Broadway Limited, was rerouted out of Lima. Through consolidation of class I railroads and subsequent abandonment and downgrading of redundant lines, the railroad industry in Lima has declined significantly: by the 1990s all passenger train service to Lima was discontinued and the former Pennsylvania's mainline through Lima had been relegated to branch line service by the Norfolk Southern Railway.  As a result, Lima's Pennsylvania station went vacant, the rest of the city's passenger train stations, freight depots and other railroad buildings had long since been demolished, and by the late 1990s all of the 67-acres of buildings that once housed the Lima Locomotive Works had also been demolished.

Recent history
Unlike much of Lima's railroad-related structures (e.g., the Baltimore & Ohio, Nickel Plate Road and Erie Railroad train stations and roundhouses), the Pennsylvania Railroad station has survived in good condition.  Its well-preserved historic architecture and its place in local history qualified it for addition to the National Register of Historic Places in 2003 as the Lima Pennsylvania Railroad Passenger Depot.  One year later, the station was renovated for adaptive reuse: although a new entrance was added and modern restrooms were attached to the station's rear, its historic integrity was little changed, and the yard surrounding the station was kept in its previous state.  Working for a Lima business association, the LJB construction company completed the renovation project in May 2004.  Today, the station is used as the offices of the customer service center for the Lima utilities department.

References

External links

Railway stations in the United States opened in 1887
Former railway stations in Ohio
Buildings and structures in Lima, Ohio
National Register of Historic Places in Allen County, Ohio
Queen Anne architecture in Ohio
Railway stations on the National Register of Historic Places in Ohio
Former Pennsylvania Railroad stations
Former Baltimore and Ohio Railroad stations
Railway stations closed in 1990
Former Amtrak stations in Ohio